Trevor John Morgan (born November 26, 1986) is an American actor. He has appeared in the films Genius, The Sixth Sense, The Patriot, A Rumor of Angels, Jurassic Park III, The Glass House, Chasing 3000, Mean Creek, Barney's Great Adventure (based on the popular children's television series), Local Color, Family Plan, and Uncle Nino.

Early life
Trevor John Morgan was born in Chicago He has three older half siblings. and a younger brother, actor, Joey Morgan. His parents are Lisa Morgan and Joe Borrasso of MbM Studios, a talent development and production company. When Morgan was five, the family relocated to Orange County, California, where Trevor appeared in various commercials. In 1997, the family moved to Los Angeles, California, so that he could pursue an acting career.

Career
Morgan first appeared in several commercials for McDonald's and Cheerios and was featured on a Life cereal box. He got his first break as Alec Mackenzie in the feature film Family Plan, which led him to appear in Barney's Great Adventure. Morgan was given the lead role of Duke Cooper in I'll Remember April. His co-star Haley Joel Osment was given the lead role of Cole Sear in The Sixth Sense, while Morgan played Cole's nemesis, a pretentious young actor.
After the success of The Sixth Sense, I'll Remember April was rushed to video due to Osment's role as Pee Wee Clayton. Morgan's picture was replaced by Osment's on the box for marketing purposes. 

Actor/director Mel Gibson, who was looking for several child actors to play his seven children in The Patriot, saw Morgan and asked him to audition for the movie. Morgan landed the role, playing son Nathan Martin.
He went on to appear in Jurassic Park III and The Glass House (2001). Among his other credits are Empire Falls, Mean Creek, Off the Black and Local Color, and the baseball flick Chasing 3000.  

Morgan appeared on the long-running NBC series ER, where he played cancer victim Scotty Anspaugh for five episodes. For this role he garnered a 1998 SAG Award along with the main cast members of the show. He also appeared on Touched by an Angel. Additional television credits include Genius (Disney Telefilms), In the Dog House (Viacom/Showtime),  Fire Co. 132 (20th Century Fox), Missing Persons (ABC), and The Offspring music video for "Kristy, Are You Doing Okay?" (as a young Dexter Holland).

Filmography

Film

Television

Awards and nominations

References

External links
 

1986 births
20th-century American male actors
21st-century American male actors
American male child actors
American male film actors
American male television actors

Living people
Male actors from Chicago
Male actors from Orange County, California